Army of Two is a video game series by Electronic Arts.

Army of Two may also refer to:
Army of Two, the first game in the series
Army of Two: The 40th Day (2010), the second game in the series
Army of Two: The Devil's Cartel (2013), the third game in the series
"Army of Two" (Dum Dums song), a 2001 song by the Dum Dums
"Army of Two" (Olly Murs song), a 2013 song by Olly Murs
American Army of Two, name commonly given to Rebecca and Abigail Bates